The Mboshi languages are a clade of Bantu languages coded Zone C.20 in Guthrie's classification. According to Nurse & Philippson (2003), apart from Kyba (Kuba), the languages form a valid node. They are:
 Kwala, Mbosi, Koyo, Akwa, Mboko
Maho (2009) adds Bwenyi.

Footnotes

References